Beatriz Haddad Maia and Luisa Stefani were the defending champions but chose not to participate.

Lizette Cabrera and Jang Su-jeong won the title, defeating Naiktha Bains and Maia Lumsden in the final, 6–7(7–9), 6–0, [11–9].

Seeds

Draw

Draw

References

External Links
Main Draw

Ilkley Trophy - Doubles